"Reveal" is a song by Swedish pop music duo Roxette, released on 10 January 2007 as the final single from the duo's fourth greatest hits compilation album, A Collection of Roxette Hits: Their 20 Greatest Songs! (2006). Gessle was reportedly unhappy with the original album version of the track, so a slightly remixed single version was created, incorporating a re-recorded middle 8. Two other remixes were also created: one by Swedish house duo The Attic, and another by record producer Kleerup.

"Reveal" became the duo's 35th and – as of 2021 – final song to enter the Swedish Singles Chart, where it peaked at number 59. Despite peaking outside the top hundred of the Russian Airplay Chart, the song has been played over 22,000 times on Russian radio alone.

Formats and track listings
All lyrics and music by Per Gessle.

 Digital download (Europe 384416–2)
 "Reveal"  – 3:43

 CD single (Europe 388416–0)
"Reveal"  – 3:29
"Reveal"  – 3:34
"Reveal"  – 3:44
"One Wish"  – 3:10

Personnel
Credits adapted from the liner notes of A Collection of Roxette Hits: Their 20 Greatest Songs!.

 Recorded at The Aerosol Grey Machine, Skåne, Sweden in June 2006
 Mixed by Christoffer Lundquist

Musicians
 Marie Fredriksson — lead and background vocals
 Per Gessle — background vocals, production
 Jens Jansson — drums
 Christoffer Lundquist — background vocals, electric and bass guitars,  programming, engineering, production
 Maria Nygren — oboe
 Clarence Öfwerman — piano, synthesizer, programming, production

Charts

Release history

References

External links 

Roxette songs
2006 singles
Songs written by Per Gessle